Rubén Blades y Son del Solar... Live! or also known as Live! is the third live album by Rubén Blades and the first with the band Son Del Solar released on March 20, 1990. For WEA International Inc. and Elektra Records. The album contains all the featured songs from Blades albums from 1984 (with Buscando América) to 1988 (with Antecedente ), with songs like Decisiones (Live), El Padre Antonio (Live) and also including his hit Pedro Navaja (Live). A song that was not in his stay in Elektra but was in Fania Records on his 1978 album Siembra.

Background 
After recording his curious English album Nothing But the Truth in 1988 Blades said goodbye to Elektra to go to Sony Music until 2002 with his studio album Mundo.

Recordings and songs 
Blades He wanted to record this album with Son Del Solar to give it a touch of eccentricity, also taking from Gabriel García Márquez the song Cuentas Del Alma, Ojos De Perro azul that was included in his album Crossover Dreams. I also include his success in Elektra Decisiones and Pedro Navaja. He also rewrote the song Muévete originally recorded by Los Van Van.

Track listing 
All songs from Live! were written and composed by Rubén Blades except Muévete written by Juan Formell y Los Van Van.

Musicians 
Obtained from Jazz en la Web (in Spanish):

Performers 
Oscar Hernandez: Piano
Mike Viñas: Bass
Ralph Irizarry: Timpani
Edwin "Eddy" Montalvo: Congas
Arturo Ortiz: Synthesizers
Robby Ameen: Drums
Roger Paiz: Bongos
Marc Quiñones: Congas
Angel "Papo" Vásquez, Reynaldo Jorge, Leopoldo Pineda: Trombones

Staff 
Obtained and adapted from Discogs:

Credits 
 Art Direction – Carol Bobolts
 Composed by Cesar Miró* (Tracks: 5), Rubén Blades* (Tracks: 1 to 4, 6 to 9)
 Engineer – Jerry Solomon
 Lead Vocals – Rubén Blades
 Mixed by Jon Fausty
 Photography by Frank W. Ockenfels III
 Original lyrics and music written by Juan Formell (Tracks:9)

References 

1990 live albums
Rubén Blades live albums
Elektra Records live albums